Heroceras descarpentriesi is a species of beetle in the family Dytiscidae, the only species in the genus Heroceras.

References

Dytiscidae